Kids Discover is an educational publisher that produces high-interest nonfiction reading for children ages 6–14. The company was founded by Mark Levine in 1991, and is family owned and operated. Ted Levine serves as the company's President and CEO.

Kids Discover Magazine was launched in 1991 as a subscription magazine. Each issue focused on a single nonfiction topic. Subscribers got a different topic each month. The first issue published was Kids Discover Pyramids. The magazine was in circulation between 1991 and 2014, with a peak circulation of approximately 350,000 readers in 2005. The company began repeating popular issues beginning in 2007. This practice caused some controversy among subscribers.

Over 150 past issues of Kids Discover Magazine are still available for sale, and are often used in elementary and middle school classrooms as a curriculum supplement.

In 2012, the company began producing iPad apps based on their most popular topics. There are currently 25 iPad apps for sale in the app store. In 2015, Kids Discover launched Kids Discover Online, a web-based subscription to their entire library. Teachers can subscribe to Kids Discover Online and use the platform with their students. The company also sells school and district licenses.

Issues 
Each issue focused on a specific topic. Kids Discover sometimes repeated its most popular topics, updating the material if required. This practice caused some controversy among subscribers.

World history and culture

American history and culture

Life sciences

Earth science

Space and physical science

Awards and nominations
Kids Discover won the Golden Lamp Award in 1999 and was a finalist for two National Magazine Awards in 1992.

References

External links

 

1991 establishments in New York City
2014 disestablishments in New York (state)
Children's magazines published in the United States
Monthly magazines published in the United States
Defunct magazines published in the United States
Magazines established in 1991
Magazines disestablished in 2014
Magazines published in New York City
Education magazines